Boy Meets Girl is a 1957 studio album by Sammy Davis Jr. and Carmen McRae.

Track listing 
 "Happy to Make Your Acquaintance" (Frank Loesser) – 3:14
 "Tea for Two" (Irving Caesar, Vincent Youmans) – 2:37
 "They Didn't Believe Me" (Jerome Kern, Herbert Reynolds) – 2:56
 "You're the Top" (Cole Porter) – 3:05
 "Cheek to Cheek" (Irving Berlin) – 4:00
 "Baby, It's Cold Outside" (Loesser) – 3:14
 "People Will Say We're in Love" (Oscar Hammerstein II, Richard Rodgers) – 3:19
 "There's a Small Hotel" (Lorenz Hart, Rodgers) – 3:30
 "A Fine Romance" (Dorothy Fields, Kern) – 2:55
 "The Things We Did Last Summer" (Sammy Cahn, Jule Styne) – 3:09
 "Two Sleepy People" (Hoagy Carmichael, Loesser) – 2:53
 "Who Cares?" (George Gershwin, Ira Gershwin) – 2:36

Personnel 

 Sammy Davis Jr. – vocals
 Carmen McRae - vocals
 Jack Pleis - director

References 

1957 albums
Sammy Davis Jr. albums
Carmen McRae albums
Albums arranged by Buddy Bregman
Decca Records albums
Vocal duet albums